Mount Cortés is a mainly ice-covered mountain,  high, on the southwest side of Gibbs Glacier in southern Graham Land. The mountain was photographed by the Ronne Antarctic Research Expedition, November 1947 (trimetrogon air photography). It was surveyed from the ground by the Falkland Islands Dependencies Survey in December 1958 and was named by the UK Antarctic Place-Names Committee for Martín Cortés de Albacar, the Spanish author of Arte de Navegar (Sevilla, 1551), an important manual of navigation.

References
 

Mountains of Graham Land
Fallières Coast